There have been two baronetcies created for the Guise family, one in the Baronetage of England and one in the Baronetage of Great Britain. The latter creation is extant as of 2014.

The Guise Baronetcy, of Elmore in the County of Gloucester, was created in the Baronetage of England on 10 July 1661 for Christopher Guise, Member of Parliament for Gloucestershire. The second Baronet also sat as Member of Parliament for Gloucestershire. The third represented Gloucestershire and Great Marlow in the House of Commons. The fourth Baronet was Member of Parliament for Aylesbury. The fifth Baronet represented Gloucestershire in Parliament. This title became extinct on his death in 1783.

The Guise Baronetcy, of Highnam Court in the County of Gloucester, was created in the Baronetage of Great Britain on 9 December 1783 for John Guise, the cousin and heir male of the last Baronet of the 1661 creation. He was the great-grandson of Henry Guise, younger brother of the first baronet. The second Baronet sat as MP for Gloucestershire and Gloucestershire East. His brother General Sir John Wright Guise, 3rd Baronet, commanded a Guards battalion in the Peninsular War.

The fourth, fifth, and sixth Baronets all served as High Sheriff of Gloucestershire.

The family surname is pronounced "Guys", as in the "Guy's" of "Guy's Hospital".

The family seat is Elmore Court, in the parish of Elmore, Gloucestershire.

Guise baronets, of Elmore (1661)

Sir Christopher Guise, 1st Baronet (–1670)
Sir John Guise, 2nd Baronet (c. 1654–1695)
Sir John Guise, 3rd Baronet (c. 1678–1732)
Sir John Guise, 4th Baronet (1701–1769)
Sir William Guise, 5th Baronet (1737–1783)

Guise baronets, of Highnam (1783)

Sir John Guise, 1st Baronet (1733–1794)
Sir Berkeley William Guise, 2nd Baronet (1775–1834)
General Sir John Wright Guise, 3rd Baronet GCB (1777–1865)
Sir William Vernon Guise, 4th Baronet (1816–1887)
Sir William Francis George Guise, 5th Baronet (1851–1920)
Sir Anselm William Edward Guise, 6th Baronet (1888–1970)
Sir John Grant Guise, 7th Baronet (1927–2007)
Sir (Christopher) James Guise, 8th Baronet (1930–2022)
Sir Anselm Mark Guise, 9th Baronet (born 1971)

The heir apparent is the present holder's son, Wylder James Guise (born 2010)

Arms
The Guise coat of arms, as displayed above the front door of Elmore Court, is blazoned Gules, seven lozenges conjoined vairé three, three and one.

In 1863 the third baronet was granted heraldic supporters, usually only borne by peers, to descend to heirs male on succession to the baronetcy. The motto is Quo honestior eo tutior, The more honest, the more safe.

References

Kidd, Charles, Williamson, David (editors). Debrett's Peerage and Baronetage (1990 edition). New York: St Martin's Press, 1990.

External links
www.elmorecourt.com

Guise
1661 establishments in England
1783 establishments in Great Britain
Extinct baronetcies in the Baronetage of England